Michael Connan Johnson (born November 26, 1962) is a former American football linebacker who played ten seasons in the National Football League, mainly with the Cleveland Browns. Previously, he played in the USFL for the Philadelphia/Baltimore Stars for two seasons.

Early years
Johnson attended DeMatha Catholic High School. He was recruited by coach Billy Hite to play football at Virginia Tech. He was an architecture major during his tenure during college. He was an Academic All-American in 1982.

His career was largely overshadowed by that of Bruce Smith during his college career. The Hokies went 31-14 during his career, but due to the time period in which they played, had to settle for only one bowl game.

Despite never playing in the ACC, he was chosen to the 2011 ACC Legends team. His accomplishments at Tech earned him a spot in the Virginia Tech Sports Hall of Fame.

Professional career
Johnson was selected by the Pittsburgh Maulers in the 1984 USFL Territorial Draft. He also was selected by the Cleveland Browns in the 1st round (18th overall) of the 1984 NFL Supplemental Draft of USFL and CFL Players.

He was traded to the Philadelphia Stars, where he played the 1984 USFL season. The team moved to Baltimore for the 1985 USFL season.

In 1986, he joined the NFL after the USFL folded. He played his first three years in the NFL in a 3-4 defense. It wasn't until 1989 that the Browns then switched up to the more traditional 4-3 defense, at which Johnson started at middle linebacker until 1993.

He made two trips to the Pro Bowl in 1989 and 1990, the latter in which he was an injury replacement. He was voted to the All-Pro team after the 1989 season. Mike has been voted by The Plain Dealer to the top 100 Browns of all-time at No. 69.

Personal life
Johnson played high school football at DeMatha High school in Hyattsville, Maryland. He graduated in the top 15% of his high school class. Johnson is the brother-in-law of former Dallas Cowboys guard Nate Newton, and uncle of Texas Longhorns running back Tre' Newton.

References

1962 births
Living people
American football linebackers
Cleveland Browns players
Detroit Lions players
American Conference Pro Bowl players
Virginia Tech Hokies football players
Philadelphia/Baltimore Stars players
People from Southport, North Carolina